Showbiz is the debut studio album by English rock band Muse, first released on 7 September 1999 through Taste Media. Recorded between April and May 1999 at RAK Studios and Sawmills Studio, respectively, the album was produced by John Leckie and Paul Reeve in conjunction with the band. Showbiz was a moderate commercial success, reaching number 29 on the UK Albums Chart. As of 2018, Showbiz has sold more than 1.2 million copies worldwide.

Showbiz was released in various regions around the world through the band's different regional labels: Naïve in France, Motor in Germany, Russia, Turkey and Ukraine, Maverick in the United States, Play It Again Sam (PIAS) in Benelux, and Avex Trax in Japan.

Background and recording
Showbiz was recorded between April 1999 and May 1999. However, the album included some older songs in Muse's repertoire, many of which can date as far back as 1996. Most of the songs on Showbiz had already been written at least by 1997. The songs featured on the album were among the "fifty or so" that Matt Bellamy had written before entering the studio. The band selected the songs which they deemed to be the more conventional and "straight-forward" to make up Showbiz. While the songs contain an eclectic and diverse sound featuring subtle classical, jazz, blues, Latin, and world music influences, they have a distinct and cohesive alternative rock aesthetic. The more experimental material was left out of the album to be included as B-sides in the single releases. A few of those songs were later featured on the compilation album Hullabaloo Soundtrack.

John Leckie, the producer of the album, started attending Muse's concerts in the latter half of 1998. Leckie was based at Sawmills recording studio, where the owner Dennis Smith had given the band free recording time the previous year, from which the Muse EP had resulted in 1998. He built up a relationship with the band during this time, coming to say that he'd "want to work with the band if ever they could afford him". Leckie had not worked with many bands for quite some time prior to doing so with Muse. The recording was finished by 15 May 1999.

Sleeve artwork
The sleeve design was criticised by Muse biographer Ben Myers, who wrote that it was "just plain strange. Ill-advised. Tacky, even" and "recalled the sort of artwork that Eighties prog-rock revivalists like Marillion used or, worse still, the doodlings of a sci-fi obsessed A-Level art student" instead of "the work of an exciting, new, distinctly modern band."

Critical reception and legacy

Upon its release, the album received positive to mixed reviews from music critics, who saw the young band's potential, but were also quick to dismiss the album as promising yet derivative of other alternative rock bands of the '90s. Several critics drew comparisons to Radiohead, due to the style of the songs, and the fact that Showbiz was produced by John Leckie, who also worked on the aforementioned band's album The Bends. Neva Chonin of Rolling Stone gave the album 3 out of 5 stars, saying Showbiz "matches Thom Yorke's penchant for majestic agony – screams and the word self-destruction pepper the title track – but with an edge that's quirkier and decidedly more ragged than their elders". Brent DiCrescenzo of Pitchfork said in his review of the album that "Muse expertly boil down Radiohead into punkish radio nuggets", but went on to question that "despite this promise, where can they go from here?", which resulted in a rating of 6.7 of a possible 10. In a less favourable review, NME said that "Showbiz is not as clever as they think it is ... "Unintended" and the title track are overwrought, prone to excruciatingly bad pseudo poetry", which ended in a 6 out of 10 score from the publication. On the other hand, a more positive review came from Edna Gundersen of USA Today, who gave the album 3 out of 4 stars, saying that the album "offers smart, seductive rock that's sophisticated but not stuffy, fun but not frilly", and that the songs "get a boost from the handsome voice of Matthew Bellamy, who builds tension by vocally snowballing from a hushed intensity to full-throttle wails."

The album has drawn a noticeably greater appreciation and following since its release, however; as of 2009, the album was ranked in the top 20 British albums of the last 20 years by the UK edition of MSN. As well as this, several songs from the album appear to have had lasting appeal among fans, such as the title track, which was one of the band's most requested songs during The Resistance Tour in 2010, when the band staged a fan vote for songs to be played during that tour's stadium leg. The song was not played; however, "Unintended" and "Cave" were played several times throughout the tour, with "Sunburn" being introduced during later performances of the tour. "Falling Down" was also played during The 2nd Law World Tour in 2012. Once again, songs from Showbiz such as "Sunburn", "Uno", "Showbiz" and "Muscle Museum" were reintroduced to their concerts in 2015, 2016 and 2017. Of these, "Showbiz" continued to make occasional appearances in 2018 and 2019.

Track listing

Charts and certifications

Weekly charts

Year-end charts

Certifications

Release history

Personnel

Muse
Matthew Bellamy – vocals; lead and rhythm guitars; piano; Hammond organ on "Falling Down", "Unintended" and "Escape"; mellotron on "Muscle Museum" and "Unintended", Wurlitzer electric piano on "Fillip" and "Hate This and I'll Love You"; synthesizers on "Cave", guitar synthesizer on "Sober"; harmonium on "Escape"; string arrangements on "Showbiz"; production and mixing on "Muscle Museum", "Unintended", "Uno" and "Sober"; artwork
Christopher Wolstenholme – bass; backing vocals; double bass on "Falling Down" and "Unintended"; production and mixing on "Muscle Museum", "Unintended", "Uno" and "Sober"
Dominic Howard – drums; percussion on "Showbiz", "Uno" and "Hate This and I'll Love You"; synthesizer on "Muscle Museum"; production and mixing on "Muscle Museum", "Unintended", "Uno" and "Sober"

Additional personnel
John Leckie – production and mixing on "Sunburn", "Fillip", "Falling Down", "Cave", "Escape", "Overdue" and "Hate This and I'll Love You"
Paul Reeve – production and mixing on "Muscle Museum", "Unintended", "Uno" and "Sober"; backing vocals on "Unintended", "Uno", "Overdue" and "Hate This and I'll Love You"
Tanya Andrew – artwork
Craig Gentle – design
Ralf Strathmann – photography
Frederic Gresse – photography

References

Notes

Additional reading

1999 debut albums
Muse (band) albums
Albums produced by John Leckie
Albums recorded at RAK Studios